Elise Breyton Buckle is a French environmental policy expert and lecturer. She is the co-president of Climate & Sustainability, co-founder of SHE Changes Climate and board member of the Climate Action Accelerator. Buckle is a professor at the Graduate Institute of International and Development Studies for the Executive Programme Graduate Institute of Geneva. She also teaches Sustainability, Innovation and Entrepreneurship at the Glion Institute of Business Education.

Education 
Buckle holds a Master's degree of International Relations and Development from the Institute of Political Science - Sciences Po Paris and Master of Science in Environmental Policy Planning and Regulation from the London School of Economics. She also holds a Post-Graduate Certificate in Education, International from the University of Nottingham.

Career
Buckle advised Ambassador Khan as Chief Negotiator for the UNFCCC COP23 Fiji Presidency leading to the successful adoption of the COP23 Decision for the Talanoa Dialogue aimed at raising climate ambition. She was also senior advisor to David Nabarro appointed by the UN Secretary General Antonio Guterres as co-facilitator of the Nature-Based Solutions coalition.

Buckle coordinated the Planetary Emergency Partnership. She advised scientist and professor Johan Rockström with a focus on planetary boundaries as well as economist Sandrine Dixson-Declèveon a paradigm shift "Beyond GDP growth". She also worked with Dixson-Declève as a senior advisor on Resilience for the UN Food Systems Summit in 2021.

Buckle is part of the Jury of the Financial Times which selected the best climate essay on women empowerment in 2022.

At UNFCCC Climate COP26, she hosted the city day on nature. For UNFCCC COP27, she became officially accredited by the UN as head of delegation. She led the SHE Changes Climate and delivered an official statement to the COP27 Presidency on gender day.

Political career
From 2018 to 2022, Buckle served as Member of the City Council for the Green Party and as Member of the Executive team for the City of Nyon, in charge of the energy transition and Human Resources. She also organized several participatory Citizens Forums on climate and sustainability at the local level. At the Municipality, she worked on women empowerment, equal salaries, inclusion, diversity, well-being, personal integrity and health at workplace. She developed the second legislation on water resilience and climate adaptation for the city and the region.

Selected publications
Le Sommet de Copenhague: un séisme politique nécessaire, Editions Ecoles des Mines, Paris, Responsabilité et Environnement: Après Copenhague, Juin 2009
Fossil Fuel Subsidies Reform in 24 OECD countries, European Parliament, Brussels, May 2012
Le Voyage de Lucien et Léa, Editions Jets d'Encre, Paris, July 2015 Voyage de Lucien et Léa
Climate Change and Labour: impacts of heat in the workforce, UNDP report, April 2016 UNDP report on Heat
Lola, l'Arbre de la Féminité, Editions Jets d'Encre Juin 2017 Lola, l'Arbre de la Féminitié
Emerging From Emergency Publication

References

External links
 
 She Changes Climate

Living people
Year of birth missing (living people)
Academic staff of the Graduate Institute of International and Development Studies